Possessed is a 2006 Malaysian horror film starring Amber Chia and Harisu, and is the second feature film by director Bjarne Wong.

Plot summary 
Amber (Malay name Nurlin) and Lisu are two sisters from China, who have come to Malaysia to further their modelling and singing careers. One day Lisu goes missing, while Amber falls into a coma and is taken back to China for treatment. She awakens five months later with no memory of her past, and returns to Malaysia with her boyfriend, Dino. Amber decides to resume her modelling career and search for Lisu, but finds herself being harassed by an obsessive male fan and haunted by visions of her sister.

Cast 
 Amber Chia as Amber
 Harisu as Lisu
 Alan Yun as Dino, Amber's boyfriend and manager
 Steve Yap as William, Lisu's boyfriend who also had an affair with Amber
 Sharifah Amani as Fara, Lisu's assistant and close friend
 Liu Yan Yan as Belle, Dino's personal assistant who is jealous of Amber
 Smyth Wong as Cisse
 Manolet as the obsessive fan

Production 
Possessed was a joint venture between Malaysia's Hock Star Entertainment and China's Beijing 3 Bros Film & Media Company, and the second feature film by director Bjarne Wong. Speaking at a press conference prior to the start of filming, Wong expressed his desire to "make a movie that is aesthetically beautiful, using the cast and especially the backdrop to show audience the beauty and wonders of Malaysia."

Filmed on a budget of RM1.5 million, Possessed was shot over a period of 20 days, mostly in the director's home city of Kuching. Wong enlisted the help of his mentor, Hong Kong filmmaker Stanley Tong, in an advisory role, and praised the cast for their hard work and enthusiasm for the film. Harisu, whose lines were spoken in her native Korean and later dubbed, also sang the films theme song.

References 

 Peter Yap, "Possessed by horror", Sun2Surf, 14 July 2006. Retrieved on 18 April 2007.
 Lim Chang Moh, "Possessed Right On Track for November Release", Cinema Online, 15 September 2006. Retrieved on 18 April 2007.

External links 
 
 At Pensonic.com
 Review at the Sarawak Film Society
 

2006 horror films
2006 films
Cantonese-language Malaysian films
2000s ghost films
Malaysian horror films
Films directed by Bjarne Wong
Transgender-related films
Malaysian ghost films
2000s Cantonese-language films